Dichomeris lividula is a moth in the family Gelechiidae. It was described by Kyu-Tek Park and Ronald W. Hodges in 1995. It is found in Taiwan.

The length of the forewings is 8-8.7 mm. The forewings are dark brown, with two indistinct dark fuscous streaks and a white strigula at three-fourths the length of the anterior margin, edged by a triangular dark brown fascia. The postmedian line is indistinct and edged with dark brown scales outwardly. The hindwings are dark grey.

References

Moths described in 1995
lividula